Kamen, at  is the highest mountain in the Putorana Plateau, Russia.

See also
List of mountains in Russia

References

External links
The highest peaks in Russia
Kamen